Iuka is a city in and the  county seat of Tishomingo County, Mississippi, United States. Its population was 3,028 at the 2010 census. Woodall Mountain, the highest point in Mississippi, is located just south of Iuka.

History 

Iuka is built on the site of a Chickasaw Indian village that is thought to have been subordinate to the settlement at Underwood Village. The name "Iuka" comes from the name of one of the chiefs of the village. Iuka was founded by David Hubbard, a wagon train scout.

Euro-American settlers arrived with the Memphis and Charleston Railroad in 1857. Before the American Civil War, the town boasted an all-female college, a boys' military academy, and a fine hotel. The Civil War brought widespread devastation when a major engagement here occurred on September 19, 1862. The Battle of Iuka resulted in 1200 to 1500 killed or wounded. The dead Confederate soldiers were buried in a long trench that eventually became Shady Grove Cemetery.

The first normal school built in the former Confederacy after the Civil War, Iuka Normal Institute, was built here. However, the town did not return to prosperity for many years. The building of Pickwick Landing Dam and Pickwick Lake by the Tennessee Valley Authority brought activity back to the town.

In 1904, water from Iuka's mineral springs won first prize for the purest and best mineral water at the World's Fair in St. Louis.

Geography

Iuka is located in northeast Mississippi. U.S. Route 72 runs through the southern part of the city from west to east, leading southeast  to Cherokee, Alabama, and northwest  to Burnsville. Mississippi Highway 25 runs to the west of downtown from south to north, leading north  to Red Sulphur Springs, Tennessee, and south  to Tishomingo.

Climate
Climate is characterized by relatively high temperatures and evenly distributed precipitation throughout the year. The Köppen Climate Classification subtype for this climate is "Cfa" (humid subtropical climate).

Demographics

2020 census

As of the 2020 United States census, there were 3,139 people, 1,244 households, and 727 families residing in the city.

2000 census
As of the census of 2000, there were 3,059 people, 1,325 households, and 809 families residing in the city. The racial makeup of the city was 91.14% White, 7.09% African American, 0.23% Native American, 0.16% Asian, 0.59% from other races, and 0.78% from two or more races. Hispanic or Latino of any race were 1.21% of the population.

There were 1,325 households, out of which 25.0% had children under the age of 18 living with them, 44.8% were married couples living together, 13.4% had a female householder with no husband present, and 38.9% were non-families. 36.9% of all households were made up of individuals, and 17.4% had someone living alone who was 65 years of age or older. The average household size was 2.13 and the average family size was 2.77.

In the city, the population was spread out, with 19.5% under the age of 18, 7.4% from 18 to 24, 23.4% from 25 to 44, 23.7% from 45 to 64, and 26.1% who were 65 years of age or older. The median age was 45 years. For every 100 females, there were 76.9 males. For every 100 females age 18 and over, there were 72.1 males.

The median income for a household in the city was $24,082, and the median income for a family was $36,863. Males had a median income of $30,449 versus $20,658 for females. The per capita income for the city was $17,261. About 16.0% of families and 20.4% of the population were below the poverty line, including 26.6% of those under age 18 and 15.4% of those age 65 or over.

Economy
A Major employer in Iuka's industrial sector is Alliant Techsystems, a major U.S. aerospace and defense contractor.

Iuka is home to the Apron Museum, the only museum in the United States dedicated to aprons.

Parks and recreation
 J. P. Coleman State Park
 Mineral Springs Park
 Jaybird Park
 Iuka Dixie Youth Baseball Fields
 Iuka Softball Complex
 Iuka Youth Soccer Fields

Education

 Tishomingo County High School
 Iuka Middle School
 Iuka Elementary School

Media

Radio Stations
WKZU "Kudzu 104.9"
W278CL 103.5
W226AJ 93.1
WOWL "FUN 91.9"
WADI 95.3 "The Bee"

TV Stations
WRMG "TV-12"

Infrastructure

Transportation

Highways
 U.S. Route 72
 Mississippi Highway 25

Railroads
 Norfolk Southern Railway
 Kansas City Southern Railway

Airports
 Iuka Airport

Healthcare 
 North Mississippi Medical Center - Iuka

Libraries
 Iuka Public Library

In popular culture
The Secret Sisters, a singing and songwriting duo from neighboring Colbert County, Alabama, wrote a song called "Iuka" for their album Put Your Needle Down.
Greg Puckett, a country singer/songwriter from Iuka, MS, wrote a song called "Sittin in Iuka" for his album A Certain Man.

See also 

 Battle of Iuka
 North Mississippi
 Tennessee-Tombigbee Waterway
 Rheta Grimsley Johnson
 Woodall Mountain
 Yellow Creek Nuclear Power Plant

References

External links

City of Iuka, Mississippi
 Historical Archives of Tishomingo County
 Pickwick Reservoir
 Iuka Airport

 
Cities in Mississippi
Cities in Tishomingo County, Mississippi
County seats in Mississippi
1857 establishments in Mississippi
Mississippi placenames of Native American origin